Contrecœur is a city in Quebec, Canada.

Contrecœur may also refer to:

 Antoine Pécaudy de Contrecœur (1596–1688)
 François-Antoine Pécaudy de Contrecœur ( – 1743)
 Claude-Pierre Pécaudy de Contrecœur (1705–1775)